The Politics of Aberdeen, Scotland have changed significantly in recent years. In 1996, under the Local Government etc. (Scotland) Act 1994, Grampian Regional Council and Aberdeen District Council were dissolved, creating the new unitary Aberdeen City Council to represent the city's council area.

Aberdeen City Council

Aberdeen City Council represents the Aberdeen City council area of Scotland. Aberdeen City Council currently comprises forty-three councillors, who represent the city's thirteen multi-member wards, and is chaired by the Lord Provost.

The council area was created in 1996, under the Local Government etc. (Scotland) Act 1994. However, a sense of Aberdeen as a city, with its own city council, can be traced back to 1900, when the city of county of Aberdeen was created. In 1975, under the Local Government (Scotland) Act 1973, the county of city was combined with Bucksburn, Dyce, Newhills, Old Machar, Peterculter and the Stoneywood areas of the county of Aberdeen and, the Nigg area of the county of Kincardine, (including Cove Bay) to form the Aberdeen district of the Grampian region.

On 9 May 1995, by resolution under section 23 of the Local Government (Scotland) Act 1973, The City of Aberdeen Council changed the name of the local government area of "City of Aberdeen" to "Aberdeen City", which remains the existing unitary council area.

Prior to the 2003 election, the council had been considered a Labour stronghold. Between 2003 and 2007, the council was under the control of a Liberal Democrat and Conservative coalition, holding 23 of the 43 seats on the council. Following the May 2007 election, contested for the first time using a system of proportional representation, the Liberal Democrats and the Scottish National Party (SNP) formed a coalition to run the council, holding 27 of the 43 seats (following an SNP by-election gain from the Conservatives on 16 August 2007, the Liberal Democrat/SNP coalition held 28 of the 43 seats). At the May 2012 election, Labour entered into a coalition with the Conservatives and the independents to run the council, with 23 out of the 43 seats.

Composition (2003–2007)

The city council's original composition from 1995 used 43 wards while using the standard first-past-the-post voting system. The final group of representative councillors and their political parties using this system were:

New wards from May 2007
Before May 2007, councillors represented 43 single-member wards, but since then, all seats were contested by the first-past-the-post electoral system. On 5 May 2007, it was the first election to use the single transferable vote system of election and multi-member wards, each ward electing three or four councillors. The Local Government Boundary Commission for Scotland completed its final recommendations for new wards for all the council areas of Scotland and for Aberdeen it was concluded that there would be 13 multi-member wards with a total of 43 councillors. This system was introduced as a result of the Local Governance (Scotland) Act 2004, and was designed to produce a form of proportional representation.

The composition of wards changed to:

4 councillors:
(1) Dyce/Bucksburn/Danestone
(2) Bridge of Don
(10) Hazlehead/Ashley/Queens Cross
(12) Torry/Ferryhill

3 councillors:
(3) Kingswells/Sheddocksley – name later changed to Kingswells/Sheddocksley/Summerhill
(4) Northfield – name later changed to Northfield/Mastrick North
(5) Hilton/Stockethill – name later changed to Hilton/Woodside/Stockethill
(6) Tillydrone/Seaton/Old Aberdeen
(7) Midstocket/Rosemount
(8) George Street/Harbour
(9) Lower Deeside
(11) Airyhall/Broomhill/Garthdee
(13) Kincorth/Loirston – name later changed to Kincorth/Nigg/Cove

Composition (2007–2012)

Changes since 2007 Election
A by-election was held in the Midstocket/Rosemount Ward following the death of the Conservatives' John Porter on 23 May 2007. The by-election, on 16 August 2007, was won by the SNP's John Corall.
In January 2011, Tillydrone/Seaton/Old Aberdeen Cllr Norman Collie resigned from the Labour Party and sat as an Independent.
A by-election was held in the Dyce/Bucksburn/Danestone Ward following the death of the Liberal Democrat's Ron Clark on 21 February 2011. The by-election, on 19 May 2011, was won by the SNP's Neil MacGregor.
In June 2011, Hazlehead/Ashley/Queens Cross Cllr Jim Farquaharson was expelled from the Conservative Party and sat as an Independent.
In June 2011, Lower Deeside Cllr Alan Milne was expelled from the Conservative Party and sat as an Independent.
A by-election was held in the Airyhall/Broomhill/Garthdee Ward following the resignation of the Liberal Democrat's Scott Cassie on 27 April 2011 after he was jailed for embezzlement. The by-election, on 23 June 2011, was won by the SNP's Gordon Scott Townson.
In September 2011, Bridge of Don Cllr Gordon Leslie was suspended from the Liberal Democrats. He subsequently resigned from the party and sat as an Independent.
In February 2012, George Street/Harbour Cllr Jim Hunter was suspended from the Labour Party. He subsequently resigned from the party and sat as an Independent.
In March 2012, Bridge of Don Cllr John Reynolds resigned from the Liberal Democrats and sat as an Independent.

Composition (2012–2017)

Changes since 2012 Election
In January 2014, Torry/Ferryhill Cllr Alan Donnelly was expelled from the Conservative Party group and sits as an Independent.
In May 2014, Midstocket/Rosemount Cllr Jenny Laing replaced Dyce/Bucksburn/Danestone Cllr Barney Crockett as Leader of the Council.
In May 2014, Midstocket/Rosemount Cllr Fraser Forsyth resigned from the Conservative Party group and sits as an Independent.

Composition (2017–2022)

UK Parliament
In the United Kingdom Parliament, the city is divided between three constituencies:

Scottish Parliament
There are three Scottish Parliament constituencies that overlap the Aberdeen City Council area in the North East Scotland electoral region:

Other MSPs in the North East Scotland electoral region (but selected by the Additional Member proportional representation system, and not in constituencies overlapping Aberdeen City or the Aberdeen City Council area) are:

Scottish independence referendum

In 2014 a referendum was held asking voters in Scotland the question: "Should Scotland be an independent country?" The referendum was held by the SNP administration after their victory in the 2011 Scottish Parliament election to determine whether Scotland should become an independent nation or remain a devolved part of the United Kingdom. Of the 3,623,344 votes cast (on a turnout of 84.6%) 2,001,926 were in favour of a "No" vote (55.3%) while 1,617,989 were "Yes" (44.7%): leading to Scotland remaining part of the United Kingdom.

The Aberdeen City local authority area had a higher than average No vote. 84,094 voters in the area voted against independence (58.6%) while 59,390 voted in favour of independence (41.4%). The Aberdeen City council area had the third lowest turnout in Scotland with 143,484 valid ballot papers on a turnout of 81.7%, ahead of Dundee and Glasgow.

Twinned cities
Aberdeen is twinned with several cities across Europe and throughout the rest of the world. These include:

See also
 Aberdeen City Youth Council
Politics of Dundee
Politics of Edinburgh
Politics of Glasgow
Politics of Scotland
Politics of the Highland council area

References

External links
Council website